The 33rd TVyNovelas Awards is an Academy of special awards to the best soap operas and TV shows. The awards ceremony took place on March 8, 2015 in Mexico City.The ceremony was televised in Mexico by El canal de las estrellas and in the United States by Univision. 

Galilea Montijo, Andrea Legarreta, Alan Tacher and Adrián Uribe hosted the show. Yo no creo en los hombres won seven awards, the most for the night. Lo que la vida me robó won five awards, Mi corazón es tuyo won four awards, including Best Telenovela, and Qué pobres tan ricos won two awards.

Summary of awards and nominations

Winners and nominees

Telenovelas 

The Awards Best Original Story or Adaptation and Best Direction, were delivered on 6 March 2015.

Others

Favoritos del público 
These awards were given on 6 March 2015.

Summary of awards and nominations

Winners and nominees

References 

TVyNovelas Awards
TVyNovelas Awards
TVyNovelas Awards
TVyNovelas Awards ceremonies